Richard W. Story (born March 3, 1953) is a senior United States district judge of the United States District Court for the Northern District of Georgia.

Education and career

Story was born in Augusta, Georgia. He received a Bachelor of Arts degree from LaGrange College in 1975 and a Juris Doctor from the University of Georgia School of Law in 1978. Story was in private practice in Gainesville, Georgia from 1978 to 1986. He was a part-time special assistant attorney general of Georgia from 1980 to 1984.

Judicial service

State judicial service 
Story was a part-time judge of the Juvenile Court of Hall County, Georgia from 1985 to 1986. He was a Chief Judge, Northeastern Judicial Circuit of the Superior Court of Georgia from 1986 to 1997.

Federal judicial service 
Story was nominated by President Bill Clinton to be a United States District Judge of the United States District Court for the Northern District of Georgia on September 15, 1997, to a seat vacated by William Clark O'Kelley. He was confirmed by the United States Senate on January 28, 1998, and received his commission on February 4, 1998. He assumed senior status on December 1, 2018.

References

Sources

1953 births
Living people
20th-century American judges
21st-century American judges
Georgia (U.S. state) state court judges
Judges of the United States District Court for the Northern District of Georgia
LaGrange College alumni
People from Augusta, Georgia
United States district court judges appointed by Bill Clinton
University of Georgia alumni